Annanur railway station is one of the railway stations of the Chennai Central–Arakkonam section of the Chennai Suburban Railway Network. Located about 18 km from Chennai Central railway station, the station serves the neighbourhood of Annanur, which is pronounced as 'Annanoor', a suburb of Chennai located west of the city centre. It has an elevation of 24.28 m above sea level. The station also has an EMU car shed complex located on the southern side.

History
The first lines in the station were electrified on 29 November 1979, with the electrification of the Chennai Central–Tiruvallur section. Additional lines at the station were electrified on 2 October 1986, with the electrification of the Villivakkam–Avadi section.

Layout
The station has four tracks and two platforms—a side platform and an island platform. The island platform houses the ticket counter. Unlike most other suburban stations on the network, the station lack several basic passenger amenities such as footbridge for pedestrian and macadamised road leading to the neighbourhoods.

Traffic
As of 2016, the railway station serves around 20,000 passengers every day.

Road overbridge
In 2012, the state government approved the construction of a 200 m long two-lane road overbridge meant for two-wheelers and cars at a cost of  240 million.

See also

 Chennai Suburban Railway
 Railway stations in Chennai

References

External links
 Annanur station at Indiarailinfo.com

Stations of Chennai Suburban Railway
Railway stations in Chennai
Railway stations in Tiruvallur district